Friheten is a Norwegian language biweekly newspaper, published by the Norwegian Communist Party (NKP).

History and profile
Friheten was founded illegally in 1941 during the German occupation of Norway due to World War II. The founders were the members of the communist wing of the resistance movement. The paper was started as a news sheet by the group and became a regular newspaper with the publication of its first issue on 14 May 1945. After the liberation in 1945 it emerged as the official party newspaper.

It is the last party-dependent newspaper left in Norway. The paper has its headquarters in Oslo.

The editor is Harald Øystein Reppesgaard.

References

External links
 Official site

1941 establishments in Norway
Publications established in 1941
Communist Party of Norway newspapers
Norwegian-language newspapers
Newspapers published in Oslo
Underground press in World War II